The Live Adventure is the first live album by Steven Curtis Chapman, released on September 3, 1993. The album was recorded on May 6, 1993, during Chapman's tour for The Great Adventure. The album was released on September 7, 1993, to CD, cassette, and VHS tape formats (VHS tape format includes an alternative box cover).

The concert video won the 1994 Gospel Music Association award for Long Form Music Video of the Year, and the song "Go There with You" won the title of Pop/Contemporary Recorded Song of the Year. The album brought Chapman his third Grammy Award, for Best Pop/Contemporary Gospel Album, in 1994. The concert video was directed by Michael Salomon, and edited by Salomon, Scott C. Wilson, and Steve Rasch.

Track listing
 "Prologue" – 1:05
 "The Great Adventure" – 4:46
 "That's Paradise" – 4:42
 "Introduction" – 1:14
 "Go There with You" – 5:15
 "Busy Man" – 4:41
 "Great Adventure Stuff" - 4:49
 Acoustic Medley: – 12:13
"My Redeemer Is Faithful and True"
"His Eyes"
"Waiting for Lightning"(S. Chapman, Tony Elenburg)
"When You are a Soldier"
"Heart's Cry"
"His Strength Is Perfect"
 "Family Talk" - 5:53
 "More to This Life" – 6:28
 "For the Sake of the Call" – 7:41
 "I Will Be Here" – 4:09
 "My Turn Now" – 3:32
 "No Better Place" – 5:34

VHS Track listing
Set 1
 "Prologue"
 "The Great Adventure"
 "That's Paradise"
 "Go There with You"
 "Busy Man"

Set 2
 "Great Adventure Stuff"
Acoustic Medley:
 "My Redeemer Is Faithful and True"
 "His Eyes"
 "Waiting for Lightning"
 "When You are a Soldier"
 "Heart's Cry"
 "His Strength Is Perfect"
 "More to This Life"

Set 3
 "For the Sake of the Call"
 "Me & Herbie"
 "This Could Be Love..."
 "I Will Be Here"
 "Got to B Tru"

Encore
 "My Turn Now"
 "No Better Place"

Personnel 
 Steven Curtis Chapman – lead vocals, acoustic guitar, electric guitar

Steven's Band 
  Scott Sheriff – keyboards, backing vocals
 Dale Oliver – lead guitars, backing vocals
 David Cleveland – rhythm guitars, mandolin, backing vocals
 Arlin Troyer – bass, backing vocals
 Dennis Kurttila – drums, backing vocals

Production 
 Producers – Phil Naish and Steven Curtis Chapman 
 Production Coordination – Bridget Evans O'Lannerghty
 Engineer – Don Worsham
 House Engineers – Dan Fraser and Ron Pasdernick
 Monitor Engineer – Rob Nevalainen
 Additional Location Recording – Steve Culp, Matt Shaw, and Steve Smith.
 Mixing and Additional Recording – Ronnie Brookshire
 Additional Second Engineer – Todd Robbins
 Recorded live at Seattle, WA.
 Additional location recording at Remote Control (Seattle, WA).
 Mixing and additional recording at Studio at Mole End (Franklin, TN).
 Production Manager, Stage and Lighting Design – Dan Brunelle
 Lighting – Christie Lights
 Additional Light Programming – Mitch Peeble
 Art Direction – Karen Philpott
 Photography – Frank Micelotta
 Technical Crew – Todd Anvik, Chris Belt, Andy Bishop, Brad Bylsma, Ron Eliovitz, Rob MacArthur, Ted Odell, Scott Peterson, Gordon Ponak and Lance Very.
 Drivers – Brad Bylsma, Greg Davidson, Mark Davidson, Scott Davis, and Paul Hortop.

References 

Steven Curtis Chapman albums
1993 live albums
Grammy Award for Best Pop/Contemporary Gospel Album
Sparrow Records live albums
Christian live video albums